On the morning of Monday March 13, 1978, at 10:15, three South-Moluccans seized the Province Hall in Assen, Netherlands. Some of the people inside escaped by jumping out of the window, including the Queen's Commissioner of the Drenthe province. 16 women and 55 men were taken hostage. Two people were killed.

Hostage-taking
The attackers demanded the release of 21 prisoners who were involved in earlier hijackings, and free transport to Schiphol airport and out of the country. An ultimatum was set for March 14 at 2pm when the attackers would shoot two of the politicians, and then one further hostage every 30 minutes

After a few hours, hostage Ko de Groot was executed in front of a window and thrown out. A photographer was wounded and an ambulance trying to get to the body of Ko de Groot was shot at.

During the night, the marines of the Bijzondere Bijstands Eenheid (BBE) forced their way into the basement. The next day, March 14 at 2:34pm, they raided the building from outside and from the basement, shortly after the attackers' deadline. One hostage was fatally wounded during the raid.

See also
 Other South Moluccan terrorist actions:
 Attempt at kidnapping Juliana of the Netherlands
 1975 Indonesian consulate hostage crisis
 1975 Dutch train hostage crisis
 1977 Dutch train hostage crisis
 1977 Dutch school hostage crisis
 List of hostage crises
 Terrorism in the European Union
 List of terrorist incidents in the Netherlands

References

External links

 Images from an armoured car unit which was involved
 South Moluccan Suicide Commando in MIPT Terrorism Knowledge Base
 News from local newspaper dagblad van het Noorden March 13, 1978
 News from local newspaper dagblad van het Noorden March 13, 1978
 News from local newspaper dagblad van het Noorden March 13, 1978

1978 Dutch province hall hostage crisis
Hostage taking in the Netherlands
Moluccan Dutch
1978 Dutch province hall hostage crisis
1978 murders in the Netherlands
Terrorist incidents in the Netherlands in the 1970s
Terrorist incidents in Europe in 1978